is an Echizen Railway Katsuyama Eiheiji Line railway station located in the city of Katsuyama, Fukui Prefecture, Japan.

Lines

Station layout
The station consists of one side platform and one island platform connected by a  level crossing. The station is staffed.  The station building is the original structure from 1914, and was designated a Registered Tangible Cultural Property on February 17, 2004.

Adjacent stations

History
Katsuyama Station was opened on March 11, 1914. On March 2, 1942 the line was transferred to the transferred to Keifuku Electric Railway. The line connecting Katsuyama with Keifuku-Ōno was discontinued on August 13, 1974 making Katsuyama the terminus of the line. Operations were halted from June 25, 2001. The station reopened on October 19, 2003 as an Echizen Railway station.

Passenger statistics
In fiscal 2015, the station was used by an average of 395 passengers daily (boarding passengers only).

Surrounding area
This station serves as the gateway station to Katsuyama, but the central business district is on the other side of the Kuzuryū River.
Aside from a bus stop and taxi stand in front of the station, the only places of note are some shops and Osaka Special Alloy Co. Ltd.'s Katsuyama Plant.
On the other side of the river, points of interest include:
Katsuyama City Hall
Katsuyama Post Office
Fukui Prefectural Dinosaur Museum (16 minutes away by taxi)
Echizen Daibutsu (Seidaiji) (10 minutes away by bus)

See also
 List of railway stations in Japan

References

External links

  

Railway stations in Fukui Prefecture
Railway stations in Japan opened in 1911
Railway stations in Japan opened in 1916
Katsuyama Eiheiji Line
Katsuyama, Fukui